Absconding may refer to:
 Escaping from incarceration or bail
 A form of swarming (honey bee)